Despise the Sun is an EP released in 1998 by the death metal band Suffocation. It was the last recording before Suffocation's breakup (and subsequent reformation in 2003), and the last to feature guitarist Doug Cerrito and bassist Chris Richards. Like the albums Effigy of the Forgotten and Pierced from Within, it was produced by Scott Burns, although it would also prove to be their last album recorded with Burns, as by the time they had reformed he had retired from the music industry.

The last track, "Catatonia", originally appeared on the Human Waste EP.

The line spoken at the beginning of "Funeral Inception" is from Kevin Spacey, said in the 1995 film The Usual Suspects.

Track listing

Personnel
Suffocation
Frank Mullen - vocals
Terrance Hobbs - lead guitar
Doug Cerrito - rhythm guitar
Chris Richards - bass
Dave Culross - drums

Production
Doug Cerrito - design, layout, logo, cover concept
Brian Harding - engineering assistant
Steve Heritage - mixing assistant, mastering assistant
Robert Weigel - band photography
Dave Culross - cover concept
Jason Fligman - executive producer
Travis Smith - artwork, design, layout, cover concept
Scott Burns - producer, engineering, mixing, mastering

References

Suffocation (band) albums
1998 EPs
Relapse Records EPs
Albums produced by Scott Burns (record producer)